Special elections to the Iowa Senate are called by the Governor of Iowa when a vacancy arises within the State Senate. If there is a vacancy in the Iowa General Assembly (i.e., the Iowa state legislature), the vacant seat must be filled by special election. If the vacancy occurs while the General Assembly is in session, the Governor must call within five days of the occurrence of the vacancy for an election as expeditiously as feasible, with a minimum 18-day notice. If the vacancy happens while the General Assembly is out of session, the special election must follow a 45-day notice, as long as the election does not coincide with a school election. All special elections must be held on a Tuesday.

List of special elections

Results

1913: District 39

1923: District 37

1933: District 4

1933: District 29

1933: District 35

1933: District 45

1944: District 2

1944: District 5

1945: District 28

1947: District 37

1963: District 15

1970: District 22

1972: District 47

1974: District 10

1976: District 15

1976: District 11

1976: District 41

1983: District 36

1985: District 45

1985: District 34

1986: District 31

1986: District 13

1989: District 18

1990: District 12

1991: District 44

1993: District 12

1994: District 5

1994: District 25

1994: District 26

1998: District 8

1999: District 46

2001: District 43

2002: District 39

2002: District 10

2003: District 26

2004: District 30

2011: District 48

2011: District 35

2011: District 18

2012: District 22

2013: District 13

2014: District 12

2016: District 45

2017: District 3

2018: District 25

2019: District 30

2021: District 41

References

Senate Special Elections
Iowa Senate
Iowa Senate